The Clement Railroad Hotel Museum, housed in the Tennessee Historical Commission’s Hotel Halbrook State Historic Site and operated by the Governor Frank G. Clement Railroad Hotel and Historical Museum Corporation, Inc. The building is one of the few remaining examples of a railroad hotel in the State of Tennessee. It is located in historic downtown Dickson, Tennessee and since opening on June 2, 2009, the museum has hosted thousands of visitors. 

Originally constructed in 1913 the Hotel Halbrook operated as a working hotel until economic factors forced its closure in 1954. Today, museum features exhibits and programming involving the history of Dickson County, Tennessee, the American Civil War, the history of the Hotel Halbrook, the American Civil Rights Movement, and the life and career of Tennessee Governor Frank G. Clement, who was born in the hotel on June 02, 1920. 

Owned by the State of Tennessee, the Clement Railroad Hotel Museum is one of the Tennessee Historical Commission's State Historic Sites, and is listed in the National Register of Historic Places. The museum receives a partial annual operating grant from the Tennessee Historical Commission. The museum is located at 100 Clement Place, or 100 Frank G. Clement Place, in Dickson, Tennessee. It was restored and opened to the public in 2009.

Museum exhibitions

Railroading
Artifacts include an oilcan, brake wheel, whistle marker, lantern, maps, postcards, and books. A folk art model of an engine and tender are almost miniature examples of an NC&St.L engine and Vanderbilt tender captured in a 1920s photograph in Dickson. This exhibit has been expanded to include a touch-screen panel of the Dickson rail-yard and downtown area.  A hands-on display of a steam engine cabin, and a NC&St.L engine headlight are also showcased.

The Clement family
The Clement family rooms are furnished to represent the early 1920s when Belle Goad and Maybelle and Robert Clement lived in the managerial suite of rooms on the first floor. Room #5, where Governor Frank Clement was born, is furnished with several pieces of furniture from the Clement family including a bed, trunk, and cradle.

Dickson County industries
The Dickson County Commerce exhibit has interpretive panels on several early businesses and industries. This exhibit includes the display of a Dixie Swatter baseball bat which was used by major league teams during the 1920s and a Commodore youth bat, a 1930s  Coca-Cola bottle impressed with 'Dickson Tenn.' on the bottom, and the 50-millionth shirt made by Red Kap.

The Dickson County History exhibit tells the story of the iron ore industry in the county as well as highlighting each of the incorporated communities: Burns, Charlotte, Slayden, Vanleer, White Bluff, and Dickson. Interpretive panels introduce visitors to the utopian community of Ruskin and Promise Land, a community founded by freed blacks.

Dickson Model Railroad display
The Dickson Model Railroad Club has partnered with the Clement Railroad Hotel Museum to establish a permanent display of model trains, landscaping, and buildings. The display is manned by volunteer "engineers" who maintain the trains as well as both entertain and educate visitors in the art of model railroading. This exhibit recreates the Dickson Rail-yard during the 1920s and 1930s.

Governor Clement
On the second floor of the museum, three exhibits on Governor Clement can be found. Visitors will follow Clement from his early days in Dickson to his gubernatorial campaigns in the 1952, 1954, and 1962. Guests will learn about Clement's many accomplishments; including his actions desegregating Tennessee, supporting the Civil Rights Movement, providing free textbooks for Tennessee school children and the establishment of the South's first community college system, establishment of the state's first department of mental health, and the expansion of roads through the Interstate system in Tennessee.
The property was listed on the National Register of Historic Places in 1990 as Halbrook Hotel.

References

External links
Clement Railroad Hotel Museum
Tennessee Historical Commission: State Owned Historic Sites: Hotel Halbrook Railroad & Local History Museum
NC & StL Railroad Preservation Society Reunion, May 2009

Hotel buildings on the National Register of Historic Places in Tennessee
Hotel buildings completed in 1912
Hotels in Tennessee
Museums in Dickson County, Tennessee
Railroad museums in Tennessee
History museums in Tennessee
Tennessee State Historic Sites
Biographical museums in Tennessee
Railway hotels in the United States
1912 establishments in Tennessee
National Register of Historic Places in Dickson County, Tennessee
Governor of Tennessee